A Lan Zayar 2 is a 2013 Burmese romantic-comedy film, directed by Nyi Nyi Htun Lwin starring Moe Aung Yin, Aung Ye Lin, Wutt Hmone Shwe Yi, Moe Yu San and Nan Su Yati Soe. It is a sequel to A Lan Zayar.

Cast
Moe Aung Yin as Lin Kar Oo
Aung Ye Lin as Moe Kaung Kin
Wutt Hmone Shwe Yi as Hsaung Kabyar
Moe Yu San as Htal Wah Thu
Nan Su Yati Soe as Theingi Maw
Chan Mi Mi Ko as Shu Ma Wa
Khin Hlaing as Kyaw Naing
Bay Lu Wa as Tin Shwe
Pwint as Aunty Yin

See also
A Lan Zayar

References

2013 films
2010s Burmese-language films
Burmese romantic comedy films
Films shot in Myanmar
2013 romantic comedy films